Norwegian county road 416 (Fv416) is a Norwegian county road in Agder county, Norway.  The  road runs between the town of Risør in Risør municipality and the Norwegian County Road 414 in the village of Myra in Vegårshei municipality.

References

416
Road transport in Agder
Vegårshei
Risør